Blindfold is a 1928 American drama film directed by Charles Klein and written by Ewart Adamson, Robert Horwood and William Kernell. The film stars Lois Moran, George O'Brien, Maria Alba, Earle Foxe, Don Terry and Fritz Feld. The film was released on December 9, 1928, by Fox Film Corporation. It was based on a story by Charles Francis Coe.

Cast      
Lois Moran as Mary Brower
George O'Brien as Robert Kelly
Maria Alba as Pepita
Earle Foxe as Dr. Cornelius Simmons
Don Terry as Buddy Brower
Fritz Feld as Thomas Bernard
Andy Clyde as Funeral
Crauford Kent as Ackroyd
Robert Homans as Captain Jenkins 
John Kelly as Chauffeur
Phillips Smalley as Jeweler

Critical reception
A review in the trade publication Harrison's Reports described the film as having a "not so pleasant" start, but added that interest increased as the film progressed until the climax "makes the spectator hold his breath".

References

External links
 

1928 films
1920s English-language films
Silent American drama films
1928 drama films
Fox Film films
American silent feature films
American black-and-white films
Films directed by Charles Klein
1920s American films